Fritz Heer (born 9 May 1959) is a German sprinter. He competed in the men's 4 × 100 metres relay at the 1988 Summer Olympics representing West Germany.

References

1959 births
Living people
Athletes (track and field) at the 1988 Summer Olympics
German male sprinters
Olympic athletes of West Germany
Place of birth missing (living people)